Shaul Magid (born June 16, 1958) is the Distinguished Fellow in Jewish Studies at Dartmouth College. From 2004-2018 he was a professor of religious studies and the Jay and Jeannie Schottenstein Chair of Jewish Studies in Modern Judaism at Indiana University as well as a senior research fellow at the Shalom Hartman Institute. Before that he served from 1996-2004 as a professor of Jewish philosophy at The Jewish Theological Seminary of America where he was chair of the Department of Jewish Philosophy from 2000-2004.

Education
Magid received his B.A. from Goddard College. He received his semicha (rabbinical ordination) in Jerusalem in 1984 from Rabbis Chaim Brovender, Yaacov Warhaftig, and Zalman Nechemia Goldberg. He became a candidate Fellow at the Shalom Hartman Institute and a graduate student in Medieval and Modern Jewish Thought at Hebrew University, where he completed his MA in 1989. He obtained his Ph.D. in Jewish thought from Brandeis University in 1994.

Career
Magid served as a visiting professor at University of Massachusetts Amherst, Clark University and Boston University. 
He was the Anna Smith Fine Chair in Jewish Thought at Rice University from 1994–1996 and then joined the faculty of the Jewish Theological Seminary of America before leaving for Indiana University. 
Major research grants include a 2015-2106 research fellowship at the Katz Center for Advanced Judaic Studies at The University of Pennsylvania and 2017-2018 National Endowment for the Humanities, Senior Fellowship at the Center for Jewish History for a book project on "American Jewish Survivalism: Meir Kahane and the Politics of Pride." 
He is an elected member of the American Academy of Jewish Research.

He has served as the rabbi of the Fire Island Synagogue since 1997. 
He is a contributing editor at Tablet Magazine and editor of Jewish Thought and Culture for Tikkun Magazine.

Magid's books include: 
Hasidism on the Margin: Reconciliation, Antinomianism, and Messianism in Izbica and Radzin Hasidism (University of Wisconsin Press, 2003), 
From Metaphysics to Midrash: Myth, History, and the Interpretation of Scripture in Lurianic Kabbala (Bloomington, IN: Indiana University Press, 2008), 
American Post-Judaism: Identity and Renewal in a Postethnic Society (Indiana University Press, 2013),
Hasidism Incarnate: Hasidism, Christianity, and the Construction of Modern Judaism (Stanford University Press, 2014), 
Piety and Rebellion: Essays in Hasidism (Academic Studies press, 2019) and 
The Bible, the Talmud, and the New Testament: Elijah Zvi Soloveitchik's Commentary to the New Testament (University of Pennsylvania Press, 2019). 
 Meir Kahane: The Public Life and Political Thought of an American Jewish Radical (Princeton University Press, 2021)
His book From Metaphysics to Midrash was awarded the 2008 American Academy of Religion Award for best book in religion in the textual studies category. 
He is the editor of God's Voice from the Void: Old and New Essays on Rabbi Nahman of Bratslav (SUNY Press, 2001) 
and co-editor of Beginning Again: Toward a Hermeneutic of Jewish Texts (Seven Bridges Press, 2002).
 
His essays have been published in Moment Magazine, Open Zion, Religion Dispatches, Tablet Magazine, Tikkun Magazine, and Zeek Magazine.

Personal life
Magid grew up as a non-observant Jew in New York when, at the age of 20, he became interested in learning more about Judaism. He became involved with the Haredi movement and studied Modern Orthodoxy, but after several years he "...abandoned Orthodoxy more generally yet remained fascinated by, and deeply invested in, the complex nexus of Judaism and the American counter-culture". He is often quoted on such issues in the popular press; for instance, he recently discussed Jerry Garcia and the Grateful Dead in relation to Judaism, speaking from the perspective of "an ordained rabbi and a professor of Jewish and religious studies at Indiana University who was also present for the Dead’s legendary performance on the grounds of Raceway Park in Englishtown, New Jersey on Sept. 3, 1977."

References

1958 births
Living people
20th-century American rabbis
21st-century American rabbis
American Conservative rabbis
American historians of religion
American Jewish theologians
American religion academics
Brandeis University alumni
Clark University faculty
Historians of Jews and Judaism
Indiana University faculty
Jewish American writers
Judaic studies
Philosophers of Judaism
Rice University faculty
Goddard College alumni